Kesten is a municipality in Germany.

Kesten may refer to:

People 
 Dieter Kesten, a German militant
 Harry Kesten (1931–2019), American mathematician
 Hermann Kesten (1900–1996), German novelist, after whom the Hermann Kesten Medal is named
 Stefan Kesten (1888–1953), French chess player

See also 
 Kesten Point